Bernard Rapoport (July 17, 1917 – April 5, 2012)  was an American entrepreneur, philanthropist, author, and the founder of American Income Life Insurance Company.

Background and education
Rapoport was born in San Antonio, Texas. His father, David Rapoport, and mother, Riva Feldman, immigrated to the United States from Russia in the early 1900s. Rapoport's upbringing was very modest, and his father peddled blankets on the streets of San Antonio.

Rapoport grew up during the Great Depression, and times for his family proved to be very hard. When Rapoport was 6 years old, his family was evicted from their home, and they continued to face financial difficulties through the Depression. Yet, throughout his youth, Rapoport felt they had much to be grateful for, including books and music.

Rapoport valued his education, and worked his way through college at a jewelry store. He graduated from The University of Texas at Austin with a Bachelor of Arts in 1939. Rapoport met Audre Newman in January 1942, and they soon married. The couple lived in Wichita Falls, Texas, where Rapoport continued his work in jewelry sales. Rapoport was also a founding father of the Gamma Deuteron Chapter of the Alpha Epsilon Pi fraternity in 1939 at the University of Texas at Austin, where he is an esteemed alumnus.

Career
In 1949, the couple moved to San Antonio, and Rapoport began his career selling insurance with Pioneer American Insurance. He realized that he had a talent for selling insurance. By the end of 1949, he had opened his own Pioneer American Agency in Waco. In 1951, Harold Goodman, Audre's uncle, was impressed with Rapoport's success and introduced him to the idea of running American Income. American Income Life Insurance Company (hereafter referred to as "American Income Life," "AIL," or "The Company") was chartered as a mutual assessment association in Indiana with $25,000 of borrowed capital. It was reinsured through American Standard as a new mutual reserve company in March 1951. The Company's home offices were located in Indianapolis, Indiana.

American Income Life originally sold low-cost hospital insurance plans. During its first year, The Company took in about $95,000 worth of premium income. The Company reached $1 million worth of insurance premiums in 1953. By 1954, AIL was receiving 6,000 insurance policy applications per month.

In September 1954, with $200,000 in capital and $100,000 of surplus, Goodman and Rapoport formed a new company called American Income Life Insurance Company (AIL). American Income Life reinsured the policies of the original company and was transformed from a mutual reserve company to a stock company. American Standard, The Company's original insurer, was merged with American Income, and The Company acquired about $400,000 worth of premiums. Between 1954 and 1955, AIL's assets had doubled, its net reserve had tripled, its capital and surplus more than doubled, and it had about $15 million of insurance in force.

In 1956, Rapoport desired to take the Indiana-based company national. He obtained a license in Ohio and opened a central office in Columbus. By the close of 1956, American Income Life was operating in 13 states with 300 sales personnel in the field operating out of 96 General Agencies. In March 1958, The Company's home offices were moved from Indianapolis, Indiana, to Waco, Texas, where Rapoport lived until his death.

Philanthropy and politics
Rapoport used his success to help others in need. With $46 million of his own money, he established the Bernard and Audre Rapoport Foundation in 1987, benefiting childcare, education, the Waco community, and other enterprises. Rapoport was appointed to a six-year term on the Board of Regents of The University of Texas System by Governor Ann Richards in 1991, serving as Chairman from 1993 until 1997. Rapoport was named by Fortune magazine as one of America's "40 most generous philanthropists," unstinting in his support for education, social justice, and liberal political causes. He has been praised by political and social dignitaries such as Chet Edwards, Speaker of the House Nancy Pelosi, Senator Hillary Clinton, President Bill Clinton, and Senators Tom Daschle and Ted Kennedy. He also provided substantial support to The Texas Observer, the leading progressive/populist political magazine in the state. Throughout his life, and still through his foundation, Rapoport was an avid donor to the University of Texas.

Rapoport was appointed by former President Bill Clinton as a member of the Advisory Committee for Trade Policy and Negotiations (ACTPN). He was a member of the Library of Congress Trust Fund Board, National Hispanic University Trustee Emeritus, Horatio Alger Association of Distinguished Americans, Economic Policy Institute, National Jobs For All Coalition, and the Joint Center for Political and Economic Studies.

References

External links

The Bernard & Audre Rapoport Foundation
A Guide to the Bernard Rapoport Papers at the University of Texas at Austin
Bernard Rapoport, 1917 - 2012, Texas Observer

People from San Antonio
People from Waco, Texas
1917 births
2012 deaths
American people of Russian descent
University of Texas at Austin alumni
20th-century American philanthropists